Casablanca Fan Company is a ceiling fan company currently based in Memphis, Tennessee.  In the late 1970s, the company became known for their premium fans, which were marketed as furniture.

History 

Casablanca was founded by Burton A. Burton in Pasadena, California in 1974.  Burton's unique marketing techniques included inviting customers aboard refurbished 1940s railroad cars from the New York Central Railroad and Rock Island Line.  By 1980, Casablanca was selling about US$42M in fans per year.  To better cope with the seasonal swings of the ceiling fan business, Casablanca purchased Lavery & Co. in 1984, a Van Nuys, California-based manufacturer of consumer lighting fixtures founded by Arthur J. Lavery in the late 1940s. By the mid-1990s, Casablanca exclusively manufactured ceiling fans.

Following a hiatus, Burton regained presidency of Casablanca in July 1985, and was named chief executive of the parent company, Casablanca Industries Inc. Reporting to Burton was Richard Y. Fisher, who was named president of Casablanca Industries. He served as chairman and president of Milwaukee-based Diana Corp. (formerly Farm House Foods), which previously acquired a 47% stake in Casablanca. In addition, S. John Gorman remained president of Lavery & Co.

In 1993, Casablanca acquired rival ceiling fan manufacturer Homestead Products following a patent infringement lawsuit that weakened the latter company, and began to consolidate its lineup into its new "Airflow by Casablanca" brand. The Airflow name was phased out in the early 2010s.

In 1996, Casablanca was purchased by Hunter Fan Company, and production was subsequently moved completely overseas by 1997. The previous motors, supplied by Emerson Electric, Samsung and Astrosyn, were replaced by a Casablanca-engineered motor, dubbed the XLP-2000. Hunter operated Casablanca as a wholly owned subsidiary until 2010.

In April 2003, Burton A. Burton died at age 75, on Orcas Island.

In 2010, Hunter closed Casablanca's corporate headquarters in Pomona, California and incorporated Casablanca's corporate operations into their own corporate headquarters in Memphis, Tennessee. Casablanca currently operates as Hunter Fan Company's luxury fan division.

Innovations 
In 1979, Casablanca introduced their Silent-Flex flywheel to replace the milled-aluminum flywheels they had been using prior. The Silent-Flex flywheel was a double-torus made of soft rubber with die-cast zinc reinforcements that acted as a shock absorber to virtually eliminate the transmission of vibration and noise from the fan's motor to the blades.

In 1981, Casablanca introduced the Slumber-Quiet system, which had a 3-way pull chain switch that controlled both the fan motor and an optional light kit, and a variable speed dial to adjust the fan's speed. This system was discontinued in 1985 and replaced with a variation of the system known as Slumber-Five, which had five fixed speeds controlled by a stepped potentiometer rather than a fully variable speed dial. Slumber-Five was discontinued after the 1985 model year.

Also in 1981, Casablanca introduced their Hang-Tru mounting system, which utilized a self-supporting ceiling canopy fastened to the junction box by four long, heavy-duty screws. The fan rested on a ball-and-socket joint and could be mounted on a ceiling angled up to 45 degrees.

In 1983, Casablanca introduced the world's first computerized ceiling fan control, called Inteli•Touch. The Inteli•Touch system was marketed as being easy to install, as the fan easily replaced a standard two-wire ceiling-mounted lighting fixture, and the wall control unit replaced a standard two-wire wall toggle switch. The Inteli•Touch control included a PC board mounted inside the fan's housing with a small piezo buzzer to emit electronic beeps to verify fan functions, and a wall control, which fed the PC board commands via coded electrical signals through home's wiring. The control was innovative because it offered complete control of the fan and light functions independently of each other without the need for additional wiring in the walls of the house, and also for the several programs that could completely automate the ceiling fan, including:

 Light-Minder, which would turn the fan's light kit off two hours after being turned on
Safe-Exit, which gave the user 30 seconds to exit the room while the fan's light kit gradually dimmed to off
Fan-Minder, which was intended to be used as the user slept to gradually lower the fan speed as the room temperature fell during the night.
Home-Safe, which would turn the fan's light kit on and off at random times to make an empty home look occupied.
An automatic demonstration/test program, which would cycle the fan and light through all of its various settings.

In 1990, Casablanca introduced their second computerized ceiling fan control, called Comfort•Touch. Comfort•Touch was the first ceiling fan control system to utilize a radio frequency remote transmitter (previous handheld remote systems offered by other manufacturers used infrared transmitters, much like a TV remote.) It was also the first ceiling fan control system to integrate an LCD display into the user interface (transmitter). The Comfort•Touch control was handheld, though it included a bracket for mounting to a wall. Comfort•Touch retained all of the settings and programs included with Inteli•Touch, with the exception of Fan-Minder, which was replaced with thermostatic control, allowing for the fan speed to be adjusted automatically corresponding to room temperature, and a "winter mode" was added, which operates the fan at its lowest speed in updraft mode, but with ten-second "bursts" of a higher speed every ten minutes in order to more effectively break up heat stratification at the ceiling. Like Inteli•Touch, the system included a PC board inside the fan's housing. In addition to the microcomputer in the fan itself, Comfort•Touch utilized a second microcomputer in the remote transmitter. The system was discontinued in 2002 and replaced by Advan-Touch.

In 2002, Casablanca introduced its third computerized ceiling fan control, called Advan-Touch. Advan-Touch replaced the older Comfort•Touch system, but included a more compact remote design. Like Comfort•Touch, it is a handheld, radio frequency remote control. Advan-Touch retained all of the fan speed and light settings offered in Inteli•Touch and Comfort•Touch, as well as the Safe-Exit and Home-Safe programs. Like Inteli•Touch and Comfort•Touch, the Advan•Touch system included a PC board inside the fan's housing.

In 2003, Casablanca introduced the Advan•Touch Plus control, which is combined with the Advan•Touch and Inteli•Touch2. It incorporates the convenience of the remote control system with an added wall control that replaces an existing light switch.

In 2010, Casablanca introduced the Inteli•Touch3 system, which combined the features of Inteli•Touch and Advan•Touch into a single, RF-based control system. The system was short-lived, being discontinued after 2013.

Safety Issues and Recalls 

In the late 1980s, a safety recall was issued for Inteli-Touch fans using Samsung motors. An electrical incompatibility between the motor and Inteli-Touch PC board resulted in several reported fires. Following this recall, Casablanca issued replacement Emerson K55 motors to customers who purchased Inteli-Touch fans with Samsung motors.

On December 13, 1993, Casablanca voluntarily recalled 3,264,000 ceiling fans manufactured from January 1981 through September 1993 after receiving 50 reports of fans falling from their ceiling mountings due to a design flaw in the Hang-Tru canopy. Following this recall, Casablanca re-designed their Hang-Tru mounting system and offered customers who purchased recalled ceiling fans a retrofit part to reduce the risk of their fan falling.

On December 17, 2015, Hunter Fan Company (now Casablanca's parent company) voluntarily recalled approximately 30,000 fans manufactured in 2013 and 2014 after receiving eight reports of fans unscrewing from their downrods while operating in updraft mode and falling, including one report of minor injury and minor property damage. Hunter urged customers to contact the company for a free in-home inspection and repair following the recall.

References

External links
 Official Casablanca Fan Company website
 Fan Installation''' website
 Official Casablanca Retailer - Del Mar Fans & Lighting website
 1993 Hang-Tru safety recall
 2015 Casablanca ceiling fan recall

Ventilation fans
Manufacturing companies based in Greater Los Angeles
Companies based in the City of Industry, California
Manufacturing companies established in 1974
1974 establishments in California